Willie Richard (November 10, 1936 – February 13, 1989), who performed as Hip Linkchain, was an American Chicago blues guitarist, singer and songwriter.

His best-known numbers were "Change My Blues" and "That Will Never Do". AllMusic described him as a "solid, no-frills bluesman". Another music journalist noted, "his composer's talents put him much above the average bluesmen". Linkchain worked with Lester Davenport, Pinetop Perkins, Tyrone Davis, and Little Walter.

Life and career
He was born in Jackson, Mississippi. His stage name was in deference to his father's nickname, Linkchain, which was due to his habit of sporting logging chains around his neck, and the boy's childhood nickname, Hipstick. He was inspired by the blues playing of Sonny Boy Williamson II, Elmore James and Little Milton, all of whom Linkchain heard in the Mississippi Delta, before he relocated to Chicago, Illinois, in 1954. He was raised in Louise, Mississippi, and picked cotton before his move north. Linkchain found regular employment playing blues guitar in the clubs of Chicago throughout the 1950s and 1960s, working at various times with the harmonica players Lester Davenport, Dusty Brown, and Little Willy Foster.

By 1959, Linkchain had formed his own band, the Chicago Twisters, with Tyrone Davis as frontman. Linkchain recorded sporadically, mainly for small independent record labels based in Chicago, and a handful of his singles were released in the 1960s. His debut album, Change My Blues, with Pinetop Perkins (piano), Rich Kirch (guitar), Right Hand Frank Bandy (bass) and Fred Grady (drums), was released by the small Teardrop Records in 1983.

Linkchain died of  mesothelioma cancer, on February 13, 1989, in Chicago

His best-known album, Airbusters, was originally released by the Netherlands-based label Black Magic in 1988, not long before he died. It was later reissued by Evidence Records.

Discography

Albums

† Jimmy and Hip Live! was a live album, recorded with Jimmy Dawkins in Champaign, Illinois, in 1982.

See also
List of Chicago blues musicians
List of electric blues musicians

References

External links

1936 births
1989 deaths
Blues musicians from Mississippi
American blues guitarists
American male guitarists
American blues singers
Chicago blues musicians
Electric blues musicians
Songwriters from Mississippi
Musicians from Jackson, Mississippi
Deaths from cancer in Illinois
20th-century American singers
20th-century American guitarists
Songwriters from Illinois
Guitarists from Illinois
Guitarists from Mississippi
20th-century American male singers
People from Humphreys County, Mississippi
American male songwriters